Events from the year 1674 in art.

Events
 The Académie royale de peinture et de sculpture holds the first Salon in Paris.

Paintings
 Mary Beale – Portrait of Jan Baptist van Helmont (approximate date)
 Claude Lorrain – Seaport
 Gerard de Lairesse – Expulsion of Heliodorus from the Temple
 Antonio Verrio – The Sea Triumph of Charles II

Births
January 12 – Alexis Simon Belle French portrait painter (died 1734)
January 28 - Jean Ranc, French portrait painter (died 1735)
June 28 – Pier Leone Ghezzi, Italian Rococo painter and caricaturist active in Rome (died 1755)
date unknown
Diego Francesco Carlone, Italian sculptor (died 1750)
Giovanni Costanzi, Italian gem engraver of the late-Baroque period (died 1754)
Giuseppe Palmieri, Italian painter (died 1740)
Giovanni Battista Parodi, Italian fresco painter (died 1730)
Marc van Duvenede, Flemish painter (died 1730)
Giampietro Zanotti, Italian painter and art historian of the late-Baroque or Rococo period (died 1765)
probable – Onofrio Avellino, Italian painter (died 1741)

Deaths
February – Leonaert Bramer, Dutch painter (born 1596)
May - Balthazard Marsy, French sculptor (born 1628)
June 4 – Jan Lievens, Dutch painter and visual artist  (born 1607)
July 30 – Karel Škréta, Czech Baroque painter (born 1610)
August 12 – Philippe de Champaigne, French Baroque portrait painter (born 1602)
September 29 – Gerbrand van den Eeckhout, Dutch Golden Age painter (born 1621)
November 4 - Kanō Tanyū, Japanese painter (born 1602)
date unknown
Charles Audran, French engraver (born 1594)
Pieter Boel, Flemish painter (born 1626)
Pedro de Camprobín, Spanish painter of animals, fruit, and flowers (born 1605)
Pieter de Jode II, engraver (born 1601)
Chöying Dorje, 10th Karmapa, head of the Kagyu School of Tibetan Buddhism and a painter and sculptor (born 1604)
Hu Zhengyan, Chinese artist, printmaker, calligrapher and publisher (born c. 1584)
Nicolas Jarry, French calligrapher (born 1620)
Vincenzo Manenti, Italian painter who worked on the cathedral at Tivoli (born 1600)
Tomás Yepes, Spanish painter of primarily bodegóns (born 1595)
probable
Kun Can, Chinese painter from Hunan who spent most of his life in Nanjing (born 1612)
Bartolommeo Torregiani, Italian painter of landscapes and portraits (date of birth unknown)
Pieter Xavery, Flemish sculptor (born 1647)

References

 
Years of the 17th century in art
1670s in art